Kittipong Jaruthanin ( or spelt Kittipong Jarutanin; born 1958 in Din Daeng District, Bangkok) is a Thai nature explorer, collector, aquarist, aquarium trader and ichthyologist. Although he did not graduate in science or biology, he is considered one of Thailand's leading freshwater fish specialists, he took on the alias "River Fish Tycoon" and "Indiana Jones Thailand".

Early life 
Jaruthanin became interested in freshwater fish in childhood and has worked with freshwater fish collection since 1975. He became serious in 1982 from studying paradise threadfin (Polynemus paradiseus) at the mouth of Bangkok Noi Canal near Phra Pin-klao Bridge.

He is regarded as the first person in the world to be able to raise wild caught this species of fish to survive in captivity.

Career 
He explores nature and rivers throughout every region of Thailand and neighboring countries such as Mekong, Mae Klong, Salween, Chao Phraya Basins or Sirindhorn Peat Swamp Forest, the largest peat swamp in Thailand. He is the discoverer and colleague holotype of freshwater fish, including various species of aquatic animals, to study and taxonomy as many new species of the world such as giant freshwater stingray (Himantura chaophraya), thinlip barb (Probarbus labeaminor), Schistura jarutanini, S. kaysonei or roughback whipray (Himantura kittipongi) and Burmese narrow-headed softshell turtle (Chitra vandijki) etc.

In the case of Burmese narrow-headed softshell turtle, he studied himself until he was sure that it was truly a new species of softshell turtle in the world. But with the delay of the data transmission process, causing the scientific name he designated to be only unfortunately synonym (nomen nudum).

He is an invited writer for many aquarium magazines in Thailand. Moreover, he is the owner of an aquarium shop, focusing on wild caught fish at the Sunday Market within Chatuchak Weekend Market. He operates a small zoo called "Home Zoo", collecting exotic pets and rare species such as capybara (Hydrochoerus hydrochaeris), flamingos, Asian narrow-headed softshell turtle (Chitra chitra), Malaysian giant turtle (Orlitia borneensis), albino elephant trunk snake (Acrochordus javanicus), Australian lungfish (Neoceratodus forsteri), Lyle's flying fox (Pteropus lylei), Chinese water dragon (Physignathus cocincinus) including coco de mer (Lodoicea maldivica) also one moment.

References

External links

Living people
Taxon authorities
Kittipong Jaruthanin
1958 births
Zoo owners
Kittipong Jaruthanin